Marxism: An Historical and Critical Study (1961; second edition 1964) is a book by the socialist intellectual George Lichtheim, in which the author provides a study of the development of Marxism from its origins to 1917. It has been seen as a classic work.

Publication history
Marxism: An Historical and Critical Study was first published in 1961 by Routledge & Kegan Paul Ltd. In 1964, it was published in a revised second edition.

Reception
Marxism: An Historical and Critical Study has been praised by authors such as the historian Peter Gay, the political scientist David McLellan, the political theorist Terrell Carver, and the historian of science Roger Smith. Gay described the book as one of the best discussions of alienation in the literature on Marx and Hegel. Carver identified the work as a classic. Smith wrote that "though sometimes criticized in detail", the work helps locate Marx "in the left political movements of the nineteenth century".

See also
 Karl Marx: His Life and Environment
 Karl Marx: His Life and Thought

References

Bibliography
Books

 
 
 
 
 

1961 non-fiction books
American non-fiction books
Books by George Lichtheim
Contemporary philosophical literature
English-language books
Marxist books
Routledge books